The Adventures of a Sexual Miscreant is a comedy web series created by Andrew Hevia and produced by stand-up comedian Jessica Gross. Filmed in Miami, Florida, the series focuses on "sex and the people who have it" and is told through quick, comedic episodes each lasting about one minute. Each season of the show runs close to five minutes and tells one complete story arc with a rotating cast, composed mostly of stand-up comedians from the South Florida comedy scene. The series is hosted by Blip.tv. As of this writing, two seasons have been released.

History
The series is based on a short film written and directed by Andrew Hevia while he was a student at the Florida State University Film School. After sitting in development for several years, the current iteration of the project came about when Jessica Gross decided to produce it, scheduling and casting the series and telling Mr. Hevia when and where to show up.

Format
In an interview published on The Heat Lightning, Hevia is said to prefer "working on projects that aren’t actor-dependent, ones where the product lives or dies by the talent of the actors. He’s trying to develop a style where he can create what he wants no matter who the actor is, using editing to propel the series."

Plot

Season 1
The five episode arc concerns a May–December romance between a quiet woman and an awkwardly forward young man.

Season 2
The four episode arc focuses on a domestic couple and a vampiric role play attempt that ends with surprising results.

Cast
Eric Anderson
Pam Bruno
Oni Perez
Irene Morales
Jessica Gross

Crew
Written, directed, shot and edited by Andrew Hevia. Produced by Jessica Gross. Gaffing and production sound recording by Joey Daoud.

Production Notes
The season one story arc was inspired by the sex advice column Savage Love, written by Dan Savage. Hevia has been an avid reader of the column for many years.

The opening title sequence changed after season one. The first season title sequence featured producer Jessica Gross putting on lipstick. The second season title sequence featured Ms. Gross putting on eyeliner.

References

External links 
 Official Site
 Official Facebook

American comedy web series